Deva is a 1989 Indian Kannada-language romantic action film, starring Vishnuvardhan and Rupini. The film was directed by Vijay and written by M. D. Sundar.

In the film, Vishnuvardhan played the role of Deva who seeks revenge from his younger brothers when they attempt to disrupt his peace after destroying his family in the past by taking advantage of his innocence.

This film was remade in Telugu as Maa Inti Katha (1990), in Tamil as Dharma Dorai (1991), and in Hindi as Tyagi  (1992), both starring Rajinikanth and the Telugu version Maa Inti Katha starring Mohan Babu.

Cast
 Vishnuvardhan 
 Rupini
 Tara
 Devaraj
 Vajramuni
 Vijayakashi
 Sundar Krishna Urs
 Sudheer
 Vijayakashi
 Avinash
 Bank Janardhan
 Mysore Lokesh
 Jyothi

Soundtrack

All the songs were composed and scored by Upendra Kumar.

Release

The film received an extremely good reception at the box office. The positive word of mouth helped in the movie's successful theatrical run. The movie ran for 15 weeks. The movie has become a cult film among Dr.Vishnuvardhan's fans. The movie is often considered to be one of the best action films in his career.

Home media 
The movie was made available as VOD on Amazon Prime Video.
The VCDs and DVDs of the film were released by Sri Ganesh Video.

References

External links 

Deva songs at Raaga

1989 films
1980s Kannada-language films
Indian action drama films
Kannada films remade in other languages
1980s action drama films
1989 crime drama films
Films directed by Vijay (director)